Mark Cairns may refer to:

 Mark Cairns (footballer) (born 1969), Scottish football goalkeeper
 Mark Cairns (squash player) (born 1967), English squash player